Vincenzo Pistacchio was a Roman Catholic prelate who served as Bishop of Bitetto (1499–1518) and Bishop of Conversano (1494–1499).

In 1494, Vincenzo Pistacchio was appointed by Pope Alexander VI as Bishop of Conversano. On 3 November 1499, he was appointed by Pope Alexander VI as Bishop of Bitetto. He served as Bishop of Bitetto until his resignation in 1518.

References

External links and additional sources
 (for Chronology of Bishops) 
 (for Chronology of Bishops) 

15th-century Italian Roman Catholic bishops
16th-century Italian Roman Catholic bishops
Bishops appointed by Pope Alexander VI